Cantanhede is a city and municipality in the Coimbra District, in the Centro Region, Portugal. The population in 2011 was 36,595, in an area of 390.88 km².

Location
Cantanhede is located in the Coimbra District, in the Baixo Mondego subregion of the Centro Region, halfway between the cities of Coimbra and Aveiro, in Portugal. 

This small town is located just 25 km from the very popular beaches of Mira and Tocha on the Atlantic coast.

History
The name "Cantanhede" comes from the Celtic cant, which means "great stone", and refers to the quarries in the region. It was the original Cantonieti, mentioned in the documentation of the centuries 11th, 12th and 13th also with the spellings Cantoniedi, Cantonidi and Cantonetu. 

Its first historical references dating back to 1087, date on which Sisnando Davides, governor of Coimbra, provided the village with fortification and promoted its repopulation. 

With a well-preserved urban area elevated to city (cidade) status by the Lei n.º 69/91, de 16 de Agosto in August 1991, and being home to a number of large and elegant houses, dating back to the 19th century, Cantanhede was granted foral in 1514 by the king Manuel I of Portugal.

Economy
Traditionally a major agriculture center, Cantanhede is at the heart of the Bairrada DOC which produces famed wines. The town is home to Biocant Park, a biotechnology park. This park is attracting biosciences companies to Cantanhede, and has the scientific background of the University of Coimbra and Aveiro University, both associated entities of the project. 

Cantanhede was growing fast, and the inauguration of the C.C. Rossio (local shopping center) helped to boost the area's economy. EXPOFACIC - Feira Agrícola, Comercial e Industrial de Cantanhede, a trade fair, agricultural show and festival, is a major event in the region and is organized every year in July, attracting thousands of visitors to Cantanhede.

Parishes

The municipality is subdivided into the following parishes:

 Ançã
 Cadima
 Cantanhede e Pocariça
 Cordinhã
 Covões e Camarneira
 Febres
 Murtede
 Ourentã
 Portunhos e Outil
 São Caetano
 Sanguinheira
 Sepins e Bolho
 Tocha
 Vilamar e Corticeiro de Cima

Famous people
 Pedro Teixeira (born in Cantanhede, unknown date - died 1640), a Portuguese explorer commissioned by the Portuguese governor of Maranhão, in current-day Brazil, to explore the Amazon in 1637.
 António Luís de Meneses (1596 - 1675 in Cantanhede) third Count of Cantanhede and a notable Portuguese general.
 João Crisóstomo de Amorim Pessoa (1810 in Cantanhede - 1888) Bishop of Santiago de Cabo Verde and archbishop of Goa and Braga.
 António Fragoso (1897 in Cantanhede - 1918 in Cantanhede), Portuguese composer and pianist.
 José de Carvalho Rodrigues Pereira (1929 in Cantanhede - 1984) an eminent lawyer for Petrogal.
 Dina Matos (born 1966 in Cantanhede) former first lady of the American state of New Jersey.
 Luís Filipe (born 1979 in Cantanhede), a footballer with 280 club caps.
 Carlitos (born 1981 in Cantanhede) retired footballer with 383 club caps.
 Nuno Dias (born 1972 in Cantanhede) futsal coach

References

External links
European People's Festival 2009.07.24 -> 08.01.
Cantanhede Municipality
Photos from Cantanhede

 
Municipalities of Coimbra District